Juan Valdez Café  is a multinational coffeehouse chain based in Colombia that specializes in coffee retail. Its purpose is to become a member of the worldwide coffee restaurant business, and promote Colombian coffee. It was created by Colombia's National Federation of Coffee Growers through Procafecol S.A.; the latter being a company established in 2002. It was named after Juan Valdez, a fictional character meant to promote Colombian-grown coffee.

History

The founding of Juan Valdez Café fulfilled the aspirations of Colombian coffee makers, who for decades advocated for the creation of a national brand. During the 1960s and 1970s, the Colombian Coffee Federation opened some outlets in Argentina and Spain, but those were closed before 1985.

However, as early as 2000, the situation was different: market prices for green coffee beans were low, and coffee had become popular everywhere, allowing for the rapid growth of coffeehouses. This opportunity was seized by Colombia's Federación Nacional de Cafeteros de Colombia in September 2002, when they established Juan Valdez Café as their official coffeehouse brand. The first location was opened in Bogotá, followed in Medellín and Cali, and later in other cities. The first international location was opened in the United States, and the company is currently in expansion.

The National Federation of Coffee Growers of Colombia established the Juan Valdez cafés as part of a marketing campaign to promote fair trade coffee. Consumers automatically support the farmers when they patronize the store. In Colombia, the coffee industry accounts for over 8% of the GDP, employing directly and indirectly more than a million people and farms spanning over half the number of towns in the whole country. The federation, established in 1927, is owned and controlled by 500,000 farmers who grow their coffee on small farms, as opposed to plantations. The issue of fair prices for coffee farmers became even more important in 2000 when coffee prices steadily dropped from $1.30 a pound in January to 75 cents a pound by December because of increased production, according to the International Coffee Organization.

Since 1960, the federation has spent $600 million building the Juan Valdez brand. However, its advertising campaign went dark in 2001 as coffee prices hit all-time lows. The federation plans to spend $75 million in the next five years to reposition itself as an upscale specialty-coffee region with a diverse line of coffee.

Juan Valdez is the only international coffeehouse authorized to officially sell Colombian coffee. In September 2007 it was given protected designation of origin granted by the European Union after an international dispute won by the Colombian National Federation of Coffee Growers on intellectual property, and the lawsuit brought against a Costa Rica-based company using the Juan Valdez slogan (Juan Valdez drinks Costa Rican coffee).

Store locations
As of 2014, Juan Valdez has 300 company-owned, joint-venture and licensed outlets in the world. International expansion, which began in 2005, brought new locations to Aruba, Guayaquil, La Paz, Lima Madrid, Miami, New York City, Quito, San José, Costa Rica, Santa Cruz de la Sierra, Panama City, Santiago and Washington D.C. Despite recent closures in the United States and Spain, the company aims to continue its expansion worldwide through a franchising scheme. The company has plans to keep expanding in Bolivia, Ecuador, Chile, San José, Costa Rica, Panama and the United States, as well as opening in new markets such as Mexico, Peru, Venezuela and the Middle East. However, the chain is still underrepresented in many countries compared to other world wide coffee chains. In June 2017, Juan Valdez Cafe franchise opened its store in Cooper City.

See also
 Coffeehouse
 List of coffeehouse chains

References

External links

 National Federation of Coffee Growers of Colombia

Companies based in Bogotá
Restaurants established in 2002
2002 establishments in Colombia
Colombian brands
Coffee brands
Coffee companies of Colombia
Coffeehouses and cafés